USS Indian Island (AG-77/AKS-25) was a Basilan-class miscellaneous auxiliary acquired by the U.S. Navy shortly before the end of  World War II.  She was used to transport personnel and carry cargo and was inactivated and disposed of shortly after the war.

Constructed at Portland, Maine 
Indian Island (AG-77) was launched under U.S. Maritime Commission contract by the New England Shipbuilding Corporation, South Portland, Maine, 19 December 1944; sponsored by Mrs. Mary H. Flaherty; acquired by the Navy 30 December 1944; converted to an AG by Bethlehem Steel Company, Brooklyn, New York; and commissioned 27 July 1945.

World War II-related service
After shakedown in Chesapeake Bay, Indian Island sailed for the U.S. West Coast via the Panama Canal Zone, arriving San Diego, California, 19 September 1945. She departed San Diego 27 September en route to Shanghai, China, and Sasebo, Japan, where she embarked veterans for return to the United States.

Returning to San Francisco 4 December, Indian Island departed for Orange, Texas, 14 December where she arrived 2 January 1946.

Inactivation
Indian Island decommissioned at Orange, Texas, 11 May 1947 and joined the Texas Group, Atlantic Reserve Fleet. Reclassified AKS-25, 18 August 1951, Indian Island remained in the Reserve Fleet until sold for scrapping in August 1960.

References
  
 NavSource Online: Service Ship Photo Archive - USS Indian Island (AG-77)

 

Basilan-class auxiliary ships
Ships built in Portland, Maine
1944 ships
World War II auxiliary ships of the United States
Liberty ships